George Thomas Knight (22 November 1795 – 25 August 1867) was a famous English amateur cricketer. He was a prominent member of Marylebone Cricket Club (MCC) who played a significant part in the introduction and legalisation of roundarm bowling between 1825 and 1835.

Knight was born at Goodnestone Park in Kent, the second son of Jane Austen's brother Edward Austen Knight. Knight's brothers, Edward, Henry and Brook, grandsons Edward and Lewis D'Aeth, and nephews Philip, Wyndham and Gerald Portal all played first-class cricket.

Knight's cricket career spanned the 1820 to 1837 seasons. He made 23 known appearances in first-class matches as a right-arm fast roundarm bowler and a late order right-handed batsman and was an occasional wicketkeeper.

He married Countess Nelson, born Hilaire Barlow, daughter of Admiral Sir Robert Barlow and the widow of William Nelson, 1st Earl Nelson. He had no children and died in 1867 at Moorfields, Hereford.

References

1795 births
1867 deaths
Sportspeople from Dover, Kent
Austen family
English cricketers
English cricketers of 1787 to 1825
English cricketers of 1826 to 1863
Marylebone Cricket Club cricketers
Hampshire cricketers
Kent cricketers
Gentlemen cricketers
Jane Austen
Gentlemen of Kent cricketers
Married v Single cricketers